The first lady or first gentleman of Hawaii is the spouse of the governor of Hawaii, an unpaid ceremonial position.  Territorial spouses carved out their roles in varied ways, from traditional wives who raised the children and supported their husbands, to philanthropists and society hostesses.  Perhaps the most personal insight into any of the spouses came from territorial governor Sanford B. Dole. Three years after the death of Anna Prentice Cate Dole, he published a small book, "for those who loved and still love Anna—my dear wife" detailing their courtship and marriage, her love of poetry, and the admiration the first governor of the Territory of Hawaii had for his wife.

Nancy Quinn bridged the change of history, as the wife of the last governor of the Territory of Hawaii and first governor of the State of Hawaii. She believed her position was to put family first, being her husband's support in a place and time when Hawaii had not yet worked out financial accommodations for care of the governor's family. Beatrice Burns was a nurse and polio survivor; so far, the only governor's spouse of Hawaii who served her term while in a wheelchair. The agendas of the first spouses have evolved as the country's social history has. Jean Ariyoshi helped reforest Hawaii with "A Million Trees of Aloha." Lynne Waihee put children's literacy first on her agenda. Vicky Cayetano was a business owner before she married Governor Ben Cayetano. Through her business acumen, a trust fund was created to erect a new residence for Hawaii's governor.

First ladies of the Territory of Hawaii

First ladies of the State of Hawaii

See also
 Spouses of the mayors of Honolulu

References

Bibliography

Further reading
 
 
  (Multiple pages referring to Anna Cate Dole)

Lists of spouses
Lists of people from Hawaii
Governor of Hawaii